James Patrick Redmond (1890–1963), also known by the nickname of "Tony", was a pioneer Australian rugby league footballer who played in the 1910s and 1920s.  He played for Glebe (twice), Western Suburbs (twice) and for St George. He played at hooker but also played at second-row.

Playing career
A local from Glebe, New South Wales, Redmond was a forward who played 14 seasons of first grade rugby league, during the early years of the NSWRFL. He made his debut for Glebe in 1911 and in the same year played in the 1911 grand final against Eastern Suburbs which Easts won 11–8.

Always known by the nickname of 'Tony', Redmond also represented the AIF during the great war.

Redmond next played for Western Suburbs, where the club finished in the top half of the table each season he played there. In 1921, Redmond joined St George and played in the club's first ever game against his former club Glebe. In 1922, Redmond rejoined Glebe and played in his second grand final against a star studded North Sydney side comprising the likes of Harold Horder, Cec Blinkhorn and Duncan Thompson. Glebe lost the match 35–3 in a heavy defeat.  In 1924, Redmond moved back to Western Suburbs and played one last game for the club before retiring.

Although mainly remembered as a player for Glebe and the Western Suburbs club, Redmond is also remembered as a member of the first St. George team in 1921.

Death
Redmond died in Sydney in 1963, aged 73.

References

1890 births
1963 deaths
Australian Army soldiers
Australian military personnel of World War I
Australian rugby league players
Date of birth missing
Date of death missing
Glebe rugby league players
Rugby league hookers
Rugby league players from Sydney
Rugby league second-rows
Sportsmen from New South Wales
St. George Dragons players
Western Suburbs Magpies players